Preston Andrew Trombly (born December 30, 1945, in Hartford, Connecticut) is an American musician and broadcast personality. He is a program host on Sirius XM's Symphony Hall classical music channel.

Trombly earned his Bachelor of Music from the University of Connecticut in 1969. He received a Master of Musical Arts degree from the Yale School of Music in 1972. He has been a Fellow in Composition and Conducting at the Tanglewood Music Center (1970), a Guggenheim Fellow (1974–1975), and a resident fellow at the MacDowell Colony. Trombly's visual art has been shown in multiple exhibitions, principally in the New York area.

In the early 1980s Trombly was active as a saxophonist and jazz clarinetist. He played with the Jaki Byard group, and also as a soloist. He has taught at Vassar College, CUNY and the Catholic University of America.

Trombly was a classical music program host at WNCN-FM from 1991 to 1993, and at WQXR-FM from 1991 to 2000.  He was also a newscaster and staff announcer at WOR-AM from 1991 to 2008. He joined Sirius Satellite Radio in 2000.

In 1997 Trombly married Margaret Mary Kelly, then the director of the Forbes Magazine Collection.

References

1945 births
Living people
American male composers
21st-century American composers
American radio personalities
Classical music radio presenters
Musicians from Hartford, Connecticut
Tanglewood Music Center alumni
University of Connecticut alumni
Yale School of Music alumni
21st-century American male musicians